The Trenton Bath House is a pivotal, influential design by the architect Louis Kahn, with the help of his associate, renowned architect Anne Tyng, at 999 Lower Ferry Road, Ewing Township, Mercer County, New Jersey, United States. It was listed in the National Register of Historic Places in 1984.

It is neither in Trenton, New Jersey, nor is it a bath house, but the so-called "Trenton Bath House" commands attention from architectural historians around the world. Designed as part of a larger plan (never executed) for the Jewish Community Center of the Delaware Valley, the "bath house" opened in 1955 and served as the entrance and changing area for patrons of an outdoor swimming pool.

From a design perspective, the bath house actually appears as a simple cruciform—four square concrete block rooms or areas, surrounding an open atrium. Each of the rooms is topped by a simple, wooden rectangular pyramid. At the corner of each room there is a large, open rectangular column that supports the roof. However, closer inspection reveals that in addition to the pure design elegance, Kahn also clarified his thinking about the utilitarian purposes of the various spaces, and it was in this building that he first articulated his notion of spaces serving and spaces served.

Kahn often spoke of this project as a turning point in his design philosophy, "From this came a generative force which is recognizable in every building which I have done since."

On August 10, 2006, Mercer County and Ewing Township purchased the bath house from the Jewish Community Center for $8.1 million, using funds from the Open Space Preservation Trust Fund.  This action ensures that the historic integrity of the bath house will be protected.  Ewing plans to use the main J.C.C. building as a senior citizens center.  The J.C.C. had planned to move to a new  site located on Clarksville Road in West Windsor Township, but funding ran out.

Model

References

External links

 Official Site of Trenton Bathhouse, 2009
 The "Trenton" Bathhouse of Louis Kahn
Louis Kahn’s Society of Rooms, a video by Stewart Hicks, a professor in the School of Architecture at the University of Illinois at Chicago, has a segment on Trenton Bath House.

Buildings and structures on the National Register of Historic Places in New Jersey
Buildings and structures completed in 1955
Buildings and structures in Mercer County, New Jersey
Ewing Township, New Jersey
Louis Kahn buildings
Modernist architecture in New Jersey
National Register of Historic Places in Mercer County, New Jersey
1955 establishments in New Jersey